No Thank You, Evil! is a 2016 tabletop game published by Monte Cook Games.

Contents
No Thank You, Evil! is a storytelling adventure game.

Reception
No Thank You, Evil! won the 2016 Origins Award for Best Role-Playing Game.

No Thank You, Evil! won the 2016 Gold ENnie Award for Best Family Game.

References

ENnies winners
Origins Award winners